The 7.62×51mm NATO (official NATO nomenclature 7.62 NATO) is a rimless, bottlenecked rifle cartridge. It is a standard for small arms among NATO countries.

First developed in the 1950s, the cartridge had first been introduced in U.S. service for the M14 rifle and M60 machine gun. Many other firearms that use the 7.62×51mm NATO remain in service today, especially various designated marksman rifles/sniper rifles and medium machine guns/general-purpose machine guns (i.e. M24 Sniper Rifle and M240 Medium Machine Gun).
The cartridge is used by military personnel, on mounted and crew-served weapons that are mounted to vehicles, aircraft, and ships.

Development

Work that would eventually develop the 7.62×51mm NATO started just after World War I when the large, powerful .30-06 Springfield cartridge proved difficult to adapt to semi-automatic rifles. A less powerful cartridge would allow a lighter firing mechanism. At the time the most promising design was the .276 Pedersen. When it was eventually demonstrated that the .30-06 Springfield was suitable for semi-automatic rifles, the .276 Pedersen was dropped.

Thus when war appeared to be looming again, only a couple of decades later, the .30-06 Springfield was the only round available, and the M1 Garand provided U.S. troops with greater firepower than their bolt action-armed opponents. The Garand performed so well that the U.S. saw little need to replace it during World War II, and the .30-06 Springfield served well beyond the Korean War and into the mid-1950s. The .30-06 Springfield was officially replaced by the 7.62 NATO M14 in 1957.

During the 1940s and early 1950s, several experiments were carried out to improve the M1 Garand semi-automatic rifle. One of the most common complaints was the limited-capacity, eight-round en-bloc clip, and many experimental designs modified the weapon with a detachable box magazine. Springfield Armory's T20 rifle was a fully automatic version. Though not adopted, experience with a fully-automatic Garand laid the groundwork for its replacement. The test program continued for several years, including both the original .30-06 Springfield round and experimental cartridges.

T65 series experimental cartridges
During the 1940s, the .300 Savage became the basis for experiments on behalf of the U.S. Military that resulted in the development of the T65 series of experimental cartridges. The original experimental case design by the Frankford Arsenal was designated the T65 and was similar to the .300 Savage case, but with less taper. The experimental cases were made from standard .30-06 Springfield cases which gave a little less capacity than standard .300 Savage cases because the Frankford Arsenal cases had slightly thicker case walls. The later T65 iterations were made from shortened .30-06 Springfield cases and were longer compared to the original T65 case as the .300 Savage has a shorter case length than the resulting 7.62 NATO. The resulting cartridges provided a ballistic performance roughly equal to the U.S. military .30-06 Springfield service cartridge. The eventual result of this competition was the T44 rifle.

When the United States developed the T65 cartridge, the British military took a different route. They had spent considerable time and effort developing the intermediate-power .280 British (7 mm) cartridge with an eye towards controllable fully automatic fire. The U.S. held to its desire not to reduce the effectiveness of individual aimed shots. The American philosophy was to use automatic fire for emergencies only and continue to use semi-automatic fire the majority of the time. After considerable debate, the Canadian Army announced they would be happy to use the .280 but only if the U.S. did as well. It was clear the U.S. was not going to use the .280 British. The British did start introducing the .280 British along with the bull-pup Rifle No. 9, but the process was stopped in the interests of harmonization across NATO. The T65E5 (7.62×51mm) was chosen as NATO's standard cartridge in 1954.

Winchester saw a market for a civilian model of the late T65 series designs and introduced it in 1952, two years prior to the NATO adoption of the T65E5 experimental cartridge iteration under the 7.62×51mm NATO designation in 1954. Winchester branded the cartridge and introduced it to the commercial hunting market as the .308 Winchester. The dimensions of .308 Winchester are almost the same as 7.62×51mm NATO. The chamber of the former has a marginally shorter headspace and thinner case walls than the latter due to changed specifications between 1952 and 1954. This allows 7.62×51mm NATO ammunition to feed reliably in rifles chambered for .308 Winchester, but can cause .308 Winchester ammunition cases to rupture when fired in rifles chambered for 7.62×51mm NATO.

Adoption in battle rifles

The T44 rifle was adopted as the M14 rifle in 1957. Around the same time Britain and Canada adopted the Belgian FN FAL (L1A1 SLR British) as the L1 followed by the West German army designated as the G1. The Germans soon transitioned to a modified version of the Spanish CETME rifle by Heckler & Koch that was adopted as the G3. With all of these firearms, it was clear that the 7.62×51mm NATO could not be fired controllably in fully automatic because of recoil. Both the M14 and FAL were later modified to limit fully automatic selection through semi-automatic versions or selector locks. Efforts were also made to improve control with bipods or heavier barrels.

While this was going on, the U.S. Project SALVO concluded that a burst of four rounds into a  circle would cause twice the number of casualties as a fully automatic burst by one of these rifles, regardless of the size of the round. They suggested using a much smaller, .22 caliber, cartridge with two bullets per cartridge (a duplex load), while other researchers investigated the promising flechette rounds that were lighter but offered better penetration than even the .30-06.

When the M14 arrived in Vietnam, it was found to have a few disadvantages. The rifle's overall length was not well suited for jungle warfare. Also, the weight of 7.62×51mm NATO cartridges limited the total amount of ammunition that could be carried in comparison with the 7.62×39mm cartridge of the Type 56 and AK-47 rifles, with which the Vietcong and North Vietnamese Army soldiers were equipped. In addition, the originally issued wooden-stocked versions of the M14 were susceptible to warping from moisture in tropical environments, producing "wandering zeroes" and other accuracy problems, which caused the adoption of fiberglass stocks.

Fighting between the big-round and small-round groups reached a peak in the early 1960s, when test after test showed the .223 Remington (M193 5.56×45mm) cartridge fired from the AR-15 allowed an eight-soldier unit to outgun an 11-soldier unit armed with M14s at ranges closer than 300 meters. U.S. troops were able to carry more than twice as much 5.56×45mm ammunition as 7.62×51mm NATO for the same weight, which allowed them an advantage against a typical NVA unit armed with Type 56-1s.

In 1964, the U.S. Army started replacing their M14s with M16s, incurring another series of complaints from the British. Regardless of the M14 having disadvantages in jungle warfare, 7.62×51mm NATO rifles stayed in military service around the world due to several factors. The 7.62×51mm NATO has proved much more effective than 5.56×45mm NATO at long ranges, and has since found popularity as a sniping round. For instance, M14 variants such as the Mk 14 Enhanced Battle Rifle and M25 Sniper Rifle were utilized in the United States military as designated marksman and sniper rifles. Shorter, easier-to-handle 7.62mm rifles like the G3 stayed in service due to their accuracy, range, cartridge effectiveness and reliability. In addition, continued if limited use in infantry rifles is a logistical convenience given the preference for 7.62×51mm NATO across NATO for general-purpose machine guns.

Specialized use

Sniper and designated marksman rifles

Specialized loadings were created for 7.62×51mm NATO-chambered sniper rifles. They used heavier and more aerodynamic bullets that had a higher ballistic coefficient than standard ball rounds, meaning they shed velocity at longer ranges more gradually. Loss of velocity is important for accurate long-range shots because dropping from supersonic to transonic speeds disturbs the flight of the bullet and adversely affects accuracy. The standard M80 ball round weighs 147 gr and from an M14 rifle and M60 machine gun has a muzzle velocity  faster than the M118LR 175 gr sniping round.

The 7.62×51mm NATO round remains in use in designated marksman rifles such as the Heckler & Koch HK417, SIG 716, FN SCAR, L129A1, and Colt Canada C20 DMR to take advantage of the effective range and accuracy potential compared with intermediate rifle rounds. Designated marksman rifles have to be effective, in terms of hit rates and terminal ballistics, at application ranges exceeding those of ordinary assault rifles and battle rifles, but do not require the extended-range performance of a dedicated sniper rifle. For this, depending on the military, sometimes specialized 7.62×51mm NATO ammunition is issued to the designated marksman.

General-purpose machine guns

The 7.62×51mm NATO round nevertheless met the designers' demands for fully automatic reliability with a full-power round. It remained the main machine gun round for almost all NATO forces well into the 1990s, even being used in adapted versions of older .30-06 Springfield machine guns such as the Browning M1919A4 from the WWII era. The .303 British Bren gun was also subject to conversion to fire the 7.62×51mm NATO round, the converted weapon being reclassified as the L4 Light machine gun. West Germany rechambered many of its WW2-era MG42s to create the MG2, and the succeeding MG3 is essentially a slightly modified version of the same weapon. 
These have been replaced to a considerable extent in the light machine gun role by 5.56×45mm NATO weapons, such as the widespread use of the M249 SAW, but the 7.62×51mm NATO fully powered cartridge is still the standard chambering for the minigun machine gun and general-purpose machine guns such as the M60E4, FN MAG/M240, HK21, MG3, AA-52, Vektor SS-77, UKM-2000 and MG5 and flexible mountings such as helicopters, jeeps, and tanks. It is also commonly found in coaxial mount applications such as found in parallel with the main gun on tanks. The characteristics of 7.62 mm bullet types were not only researched in the 20th century, but were also subject to 21st century ballistic studies.

Post-2010 developments
The U.S. Army developed an improved version of the M80 ball 7.62mm round, designated the M80A1. The M80A1 incorporates changes found in the M855A1 5.56 mm round. Like the M855A1, the M80A1 has better hard-target penetration, more consistent performance against soft targets, and significantly increased distances of these effects over the M80. The bullet is redesigned with a copper jacket and exposed hardened steel penetrator, eliminating  of lead with production of each M80A1 projectile. The M80A1 began fielding in September 2014. The Army plans to replace both the M80A1 Enhanced Performance Round and M993 Armor Piercing round with the XM1158 Advanced Armor Piercing Round (ADVAP) beginning in 2020. Its type designation progressed to M1158 and it has been in low-rate initial production since May 2019.

The U.S. Special Operations Command plans to begin fielding of the 6.5mm Creedmoor cartridge in early 2019 to replace the 7.62×51mm NATO round in semi-automatic sniper rifles. The same rifles can use the new cartridge, as their similar dimensions allow the same magazines to be used and the weapon only requires a barrel change.

Cartridge dimensions

The 7.62×51mm NATO has 3.38 ml (52.0 grains) cartridge case capacity. The exterior shape of the case was designed to promote reliable case feeding and extraction in bolt-action rifles and machine guns alike, under extreme conditions.

7.62×51mm NATO cartridge dimensions. All dimensions in millimeters (mm).

Americans would define the shoulder angle at alpha/2 = 20 degrees. The common rifling twist rate for this cartridge is 305 mm (1 in 12 in), 4 grooves, Ø lands = 7.62 mm, Ø grooves = 7.82 mm, land width = 4.47 mm. The primer type can be Berdan or Boxer Large Rifle. U.S. Army Research Laboratory (ARL) research papers on the influence of Berdan and Boxer primer spit-hole diameter on 7.62-mm cartridge performance concluded the primary advantage of a Berdan primer is that they are less expensive than a Boxer primer due to their reduced complexity. The ARL found there is little variation in the pressure-time curves between the different spit-hole configurations. Doubling the area of the spit-hole or incorporating a Berdan style spit-hole with the same total area as a standard M80 round showed minimal effects on the overall performance. The standard Boxer primed M80 showed the best results. All measured differences are within one standard deviation and are not significant.

According to the official NATO EPVAT NAAG-LG/3-SG/1 rulings the 7.62×51mm NATO can handle up to  Pmax piezo pressure. The proof round pressure requirement is  piezo pressure recorded in a NATO design EPVAT barrel with a Kistler 6215 transducer, HPI GP6 transducer or by equipment to C.I.P. requirements.

The 7.62×51mm NATO cartridge approaches the ballistic performance of the original U.S. military .30-06 Springfield M1906 service cartridge. Modern propellants allowed for similar performance from a smaller case with less case capacity, a case that requires less brass and yields a shorter cartridge. This shorter cartridge allows a slight reduction in the size and weight of firearms that chamber it, and better cycling in automatic and semi-automatic rifles.

7.62×51mm NATO vs. .308 Winchester
Although originating from an identical preceding series of experimental cartridges, the commercial 1952 .308 Winchester and the military 1954 7.62×51mm NATO chamberings have evolved separately but remain similar enough that they can be loaded into rifles chambered for the other round, but the .308 Winchester cartridges are typically loaded to higher pressures than 7.62×51mm NATO service cartridges. Even though the Sporting Arms and Ammunition Manufacturers' Institute (SAAMI) does not consider it unsafe to fire the commercial .308 Winchester rounds in weapons chambered for the military 7.62×51mm NATO round, there is significant discussion about compatible chambers and muzzle pressures between the two cartridges based on powder loads, chamber dimensions and wall thicknesses in the web area of the military compared to commercial cartridge cases. As the chambers may differ accordingly the head space gauges used for the two chamberings differ.

Military cartridge types

Australia
 Cartridge, Caliber 7.62mm, NATO, Ball, F4 (Australia):  7.62×51mm NATO ball cartridge.  Australian equivalent to U.S. M80 round.  In service with the Australian Defence Force as linked ammo for the General Support Machine Gun (GSMG) and F89 Maximi.
 Cartridge, Caliber 7.62mm, NATO, Ball, F62 (Australia): 7.62×51mm NATO tracer cartridge.  Australian equivalent to U.S. M62 round. In service with the Australian Defence Force as linked machinegun ammo for the MAG.58 (mixed 4 Ball : 1 Tracer).

Belgium
 SS77/1 (Ball): Designed by FN Herstal and adopted in 1957 by NATO.
 L78 (Tracer): Designed by FN Herstal.
 P80/1 (Armor Piercing): Designed by FN Herstal. The round is used in ballistic tests for the TR and VPAM body armor standards.
 Blank: Designed by FN Herstal.

Canada
 C21 (Ball): The projectile weights  and has a muzzle velocity of  ± . Produced by General Dynamics Ordnance and Tactical Systems – Canada.
Produced by General Dynamics Ordnance and Tactical Systems – Canada.
 C24 (Blank): Produced by General Dynamics Ordnance and Tactical Systems – Canada.
 C175 (Sniper): The Sierra HPBT projectile weights  and has a muzzle velocity of  ± . Produced by General Dynamics Ordnance and Tactical Systems – Canada.
 C181 (Sniper): The Sierra HPBT projectile weights  and has a muzzle velocity of  ± . Produced by General Dynamics Ordnance and Tactical Systems – Canada.

China
 CS/DFL3 used with CS/LR4 sniper rifle
 DJP-201 used with QJY-201 general purpose machine gun
 DBU-203 used with QBU-203 sniper rifle

Germany
 Patrone AB22, 7.62mm × 51, DM41, Weichkern ("soft-core", or "ball"),  (West Germany): 7.62×51mm NATO ball cartridge; Berdan primed, copper-washed steel jacket. German equivalent to U.S. 7.62×51mm M80 round. Standard service round for the G3 battle rifle.
 Patrone AB22, 7.62mm × 51, DM111, Weichkern,  (Germany):  7.62×51mm NATO ball cartridge, cupronickel-coated steel jacket. German equivalent to U.S. M80 round. In service with the German military. Known for severe fragmentation in human tissue due to its thin jacket, particularly around the cannelure.
 Patrone, 7.62mm × 51, DM111A1,  (Germany): Further development of the DM111.  Retained "green" primer in place of lead acid primer and lead core capped with closure disc.  Instead of steel jacket with gilding metal plating, the DM111A1 has a gilding metal jacket.  Fragments in soft tissue, sometimes including the closure disc separating from the projectile base.
 Patrone, 7.62mm × 51, DM111A2,  (Germany): Further low pollutant development of the DM111A1.
 Patrone, 7.62mm × 51, DM151, Hartkern ("hard-core", or "armor-piercing), (Germany): 7.62×51mm NATO armor-piercing cartridge, tungsten carbide core, cupronickel-coated steel jacket. In service with the German military.
 Patrone AM31, 7.62mm × 51, DM28A2, Manöver ("maneuver"), (Germany): Blanks, olive colored plastic with a brass base
 Patrone AM32, 7.62mm × 51, DM18A1B1, Übung ("practice"), (Germany):  7.62×51mm NATO plastic training cartridge, plastic case cartridge colored light blue with a light 10-grain plastic bullet which is fired with a high initial velocity. Non-corrosive, steel base with lead free primer. Developed from the Norwegian NM8 and NM127 short range practice rounds made by Bakelittfabrikken. Non-reloadable due to the plastic case.

Israel
 IMI, 7.62mm × 51mm, long range match 175 gr (Israel):  7.62×51mm NATO Match-grade round specifically designed for long-range sniping and optimized for the Israel Defense Forces sniper rifles, mainly the M24 SWS. It uses a  Match King OTM-BT. An IDF M24 SWS with this round achieves accuracy of 0.5 MOA.  Produced at IMI Systems "Izhak" Ammunition Plant in Israel.

South Africa
Cartridge, 7.62×51mm, Ball: SS77/1 equivalent assembled by the South African Mint from imported Belgian components.
Cartridge, 7.62×51mm, Tracer: L78 equivalent assembled by the South African Mint from imported Belgian components.
Cartridge, 7.62×51mm, Ball, Mk. 1/A1: Ball round produced by the South African Mint from 1961 to 1965 and by Pretoria Metal Pressings (currently a division of Denel) from 1965 to 1972. Rounds produced after 1968 were redesignated as "A1".
Cartridge, 7.62×51mm, Drill, Mk. 1/A1: Drill round produced by the South African Mint from 1964 to 1965 and by Pretoria Metal Pressings from 1965 to 1972. Rounds produced after 1968 were redesignated as "A1".
Cartridge, 7.62×51mm, Blank, Mk. 1/A1: Blank cartridge produced by Pretoria Metal Pressings from 1967 to 1972. Rounds produced after 1968 were redesignated as "A1".
Cartridge, 7.62×51mm, Proof: Proof round produced by Pretoria Metal Pressings from 1967 to 1972. Rounds produced until 1970 had a green tip, with subsequent rounds having a honey-coloured tip; the last rounds to be produced had honey colouring on the base as well. A warmer round variation exists with purple colouring on the tip, base, or both.
Cartridge, 7.62×51mm, Tracer, G.A1: Tracer round produced by Pretoria Metal Pressings from 1968 to 1972.
Cartridge, 7.62×51mm, Practice, A1 P: Short-range practice round with a plastic bullet produced by Pretoria Metal Pressings from 1970 to 1972. While both blue and orange versions were produced, only the latter was officially adopted.
Round, 7.62×51mm, Ball, R1M1: M59 equivalent produced by Pretoria Metal Pressings from 1973 to 1982.
Round, 7.62×51mm, Tracer, G.R1M1: Tracer round produced by Pretoria Metal Pressings from 1973 to 1982.
Cartridge, 7.62×51mm, Blank, L.R1M1/M2: Blank cartridge produced by Pretoria Metal Pressings from 1973 to 1982. Only 1973 rounds were produced to M1 standard (straight three-lobe petal crimp), with all subsequent production being to the M2 standard (slightly twisted three-lobe petal crimp).
Cartridge, 7.62×51mm, H.R1M1/M2: Grenade-launching cartridge produced by Pretoria Metal Pressings from 1973 to 1982. Versions were produced for use with 75mm and 103mm rifle grenades.
Round, 7.62×51mm, Proof, R1M1: Proof round produced by Pretoria Metal Pressings from 1974 to 1982. Rounds had honey colouring on the base and tip until 1980 (black base on 1980 rounds, yellow base and tip on 1981 rounds). A warmer round variation exists with purple colouring on the base only.
Round, 7.62×51mm, Drill, R1M1/M2: Drill round produced by Pretoria Metal Pressings from 1973 to 1982.
Round, 7.62×51mm, Practice, R1M1: Short-range practice round with an orange plastic bullet produced by Pretoria Metal Pressings from 1973 to 1982. Some rounds produced after 1981 used black or white bullets.
Round, 7.62×51mm, Ball, M1A1-A5: M80 equivalent produced by Pretoria Metal Pressings from 1983 onwards.
Round, 7.62×51mm, Tracer, M2A1-A5: M62 equivalent produced by Pretoria Metal Pressings from 1983 onwards.
Cartridge, 7.62×51mm, Blank, M4A2/A3/A4: M82 equivalent produced by Pretoria Metal Pressings from 1983 onwards.
Cartridge, 7.62×51mm, Grenade Launcher, M5A1/A2/A3: Grenade-launching cartridge produced by Pretoria Metal Pressings from 1983 onwards.
Round, 7.62×51mm, Plastic Ball, M11A1/A2: Short-range practice round with a black plastic bullet produced by Pretoria Metal Pressings from 1983 onwards.
Round, 7.62×51mm, Proof (High Pressure), M13A1/A2/A3: Proof round produced by Pretoria Metal Pressings from 1983 onwards. Rounds have yellow colouring on the base, tip, or both.
Round, 7.62×51mm, Drill, M14A1/A2: Drill round produced by Pretoria Metal Pressings from 1983 onwards.
Round, 7.62×51mm, Ball, M80: M80 equivalent produced by Pretoria Metal Pressings for export sales.
Round, 7.62×51mm, Tracer, M62: M62 equivalent produced by Pretoria Metal Pressings for export sales.
Cartridge, 7.62×51mm, Blank, M82: M82 equivalent produced by Pretoria Metal Pressings for export sales.

United Kingdom

 Cartridge, grenade, L1A1: Grenade-launching cartridge with one subvariant (L1A2).
 Round, 7.62mm Ball, L2A1-A4:  ball round
 Cartridge, 7.62mm Blank, L10A1/A2: Blank training round complement to L2
 Cartridge, 7.62mm Blank, L13A1: Blank training round complement to L2
 Round, 7.62mm Ball, Sniper, L42A1-A3:  sniper-grade ball round manufactured to tighter standards
 Cartridge, 7.62mm Blank, L43A1: Blank training round complement to L44A1
 Round, 7.62mm Ball, L44A1:  ball round
 Round, 7.62mm Tracer, L45A1: Tracer round complement to L44A1
 Round, 7.62mm Ball, L59A1/A2:  "High Performance" ball round with a hardened steel tip

United States

 Cartridge, caliber 7.62mm, NATO, ball, M59 (United States):  7.62×51mm NATO ball cartridge. A further development of the initial T65 cartridge. It has a long heavy bullet with a semi-armor-piercing iron or mild steel core and a gilded steel jacket. After the Vietnam War it was replaced by the M80 ball cartridge as the standard round.
 Cartridge, caliber 7.62mm, NATO, high pressure test, M60 (United States): 7.62×51mm NATO test cartridge. The cartridge is not for field issue, but is used for proof firing of weapons during manufacture, test, or repair. The cartridge is identified by a stannic-stained (silvered) case.
 Cartridge, caliber 7.62mm, NATO, armor piercing, M61 (United States):  7.62×51mm NATO armor-piercing round, black cartridge tip.
 Cartridge, caliber 7.62mm, NATO, tracer, M62 (United States):  tracer cartridge, orange cartridge tip.
 Cartridge, caliber 7.62mm, NATO, dummy, M63 (United States): The cartridge is used for practice in loading 7.62mm weapons for simulated firing to detect flinching of personnel during firing and for inspecting and testing the weapon mechanism. The cartridge is identified by six longitudinal corrugations (flutings) on the cartridge case. There is no primer and no vent hole in the primer pocket.
 Cartridge, caliber 7.62mm, NATO, grenade, M64 (United States): 7.62×51mm NATO grenade launching blank. The cartridge is identified by a rose-petal (rosette-crimp) closure of the cartridge case mouth and sealed with red lacquer. The cartridge provides pressure upon functioning to project rifle grenade to a desired target when using a grenade projectile adapter and dragon missile launch effect trainer (LET).
 Cartridge, caliber 7.62mm, NATO, ball, M80 (United States):  7.62×51mm NATO ball cartridge. The U.S. Army's Ballistic Research Laboratory measured a ballistic coefficient (G7 BC) of 0.200 and form factor (G7 i) of 1.105 for the M80 ball projectile. Another source mentions a slightly higher ballistic coefficient (G7 BC) of 0.209.
 Cartridge, caliber 7.62mm, NATO, ball, enhanced projectile round, M80A1 (United States):  M80 lead free (LF) 7.62×51mm NATO ball cartridge.  of lead eliminated per M80A1 projectile.
 Cartridge, caliber 7.62mm, NATO, blank, M82 (United States): 7.62×51mm NATO cartridge is used in rifles and machine guns equipped with blank firing attachments to simulate firing in training exercises and for performing military honors. The cartridge is identified by its double tapered (bottle nose) neck and absence of a bullet.
 Cartridge, caliber 7.62mm, NATO, ball, silent, XM115 (United States): Little is known of this round, but it was an attempt to quiet the round. Never adopted.
 Cartridge, caliber 7.62mm, NATO, match, M118 (United States):  7.62×51mm NATO full metal jacket boat-tail round specifically designed for Match purposes.  The round was introduced as the XM118 match in 1963 and was produced at both Frankford Arsenal and Lake City Army Ammunition Plant. It was standardized as M118 match in mid-1965. It used the same bullet as the .30-06 Springfield M72 match ball round, match-grade brass cartridges, and used fitted No. 43 primers. Production ceased at Frankford in 1965 but continued at Lake City until the early 1980s. Lake City used dedicated equipment to produce the ammo up until the mid-1970s and during that time the quality of the ammunition was quite good. When they ceased using dedicated machinery the quality of the ammo had a very noticeable decline.
 Cartridge, caliber 7.62mm, NATO, ball, special, M118 (United States):  7.62×51mm NATO full metal jacket boat-tail round specifically designed for match purposes.  Produced by Lake City Army Ammunition Plant.  This is an interim match round which utilized standard M80 ball brass cartridges with the  full-metal jacketed ball boat-tailed (FMJBT) bullet and staked No. 34 or No. 36 primers.  During this period in the early to late 1980s the performance of the round declined. Powder, primers, and brass were the same as standard ball rounds; bullets and powder charges varied in weight due to worn machinery and poor quality control. Since it could not be called "match" due to its erratic trajectory, it was renamed "special ball". Snipers used to test shoot batches of ammo, find a batch that shot well (or at least consistently), then zeroed their weapon to that batch and tried to procure as much of that ammo as possible.  
 Cartridge, caliber 7.62mm, NATO, ball, special, M118LR (United States):  7.62×51mm NATO match-grade round specifically designed for long-range sniping. It uses a  Sierra Match King hollow point boat-tail bullet with a ballistic coefficient (G7 BC) of 0.243. Produced at Lake City Army Ammunition Plant. The propellant's noticeable muzzle flash and temperature sensitivity led to the development of the MK 316 MOD 0 for special operations use.
 Cartridge, caliber 7.62mm, NATO, frangible, M160 (United States):  7.62×51mm NATO frangible bullet, upon striking a target, disintegrates, leaving a mark at the point of impact.
 Cartridge, caliber 7.62mm, NATO, dummy, M172 (United States): 7.62×51mm NATO cartridge is inert and is used to test the mechanism and metallic link belts of 7.62mm weapons. The cartridge is identified by a black oxide finish over the entire round and has no primer. There is no vent hole in the primer pocket.
 Cartridge, caliber 7.62mm, NATO, ball, overhead fire, XM178 (United States): 7.62×51mm NATO overhead fire application (OFA) cartridge using a solid  turned gilding metal (GM) bullet. These were developed to make the OFA cartridges safer since there would be no small pieces of bullet that could separate and fall on the troops. Never adopted.
 Cartridge, caliber 7.62mm, NATO, tracer, overhead fire, XM179 (United States): 7.62×51mm NATO overhead fire application (OFA) cartridge using a solid, turned GM bullet. These were developed to make the OFA cartridges safer since there would be no small pieces of bullet that could separate and fall on the troops. XM179/XM180 difference is the amount of trace mixture. Never adopted.
 Cartridge, caliber 7.62mm, NATO, tracer, overhead fire, XM180 (United States): 7.62×51mm NATO overhead fire application (OFA) cartridge using a solid, turned GM bullet. These were developed to make the OFA cartridges safer since there would be no small pieces of bullet that could separate and fall on the troops. XM179/XM180 difference is the amount of trace mixture. Never adopted.
 Cartridge, caliber 7.62mm, NATO, blank, XM192 (United States): 7.62×51mm short-case rose-crimped blank. Never adopted.
 Cartridge, caliber 7.62mm, NATO, duplex, M198 (green tip) (United States): 7.62×51mm NATO duplex ball round with two  bullets.  The developmental designation was T314E3. It was meant to increase the M14's volume of fire by doubling the number of bullets it could fire per minute. Green cartridge tip.
 Cartridge, caliber 7.62mm, NATO, ball, low recoil, XM256 (United States): 7.62×51mm NATO single  bullet from M198 round. Another attempt to control the M14 in full auto mode or for small stature troops. White cartridge tip. Never adopted.
 Cartridge, caliber 7.62mm, NATO, tracer, M276 (United States): 7.62×51mm NATO so-called "dim tracer" with reduced effect primarily for use with night vision devices, violet bullet tip.
 Cartridge, caliber 7.62mm, NATO, match, M852 (United States):  7.62×51mm NATO hollow-point boat-tail cartridge, specifically designed for use in national match competitions. It was dubbed "Mexican match" because it was based on the international match loading used at the Pan-Am Games in Mexico. It used standard brass, primer, and propellant, but used a match-grade bullet. It was later approved by U.S. Army JAG in the 1990s for combat use by snipers. It replaced the M118SB as the standard match round. The bullet was very accurate at around 300 meters (competition match ranges) but suffered at longer ranges.
 Cartridge, caliber 7.62mm, NATO, saboted light armor penetrator, M948 (United States): 7.62×51mm NATO saboted light armor penetrator cartridge. Adopted in limited quantities only by U.S. Army.
 Cartridge, caliber 7.62mm, NATO, saboted light armor penetrator tracer, M959 (United States): 7.62×51mm NATO saboted light armor penetrator cartridge with tracer element. Adopted in limited quantities only by U.S. Army.
 Cartridge, caliber 7.62mm, NATO, ball, training, M973 (United States): 7.62×51mm NATO SRTA ball training round. Has air brake to reduce the range the bullet will fly
 Cartridge, caliber 7.62mm, NATO, tracer, training, M974 (United States): 7.62×51mm NATO SRTA tracer training round. Has air brake to reduce the range the bullet will fly
 Cartridge, caliber 7.62mm, NATO, armor piercing, M993 (United States):  7.62×51mm NATO armor-piercing round, black cartridge tip. Can penetrate 18 mm of RHA at 100 meters.
 Cartridge, caliber 7.62mm, NATO, advanced armor piercing, M1158: 7.62x51mm NATO advanced armor piercing round, black cartridge tip surrounded by copper jacket
 Cartridge, caliber 7.62mm special ball, long range, MK 316 MOD 0 (United States): A  round specifically designed for long-range sniping consisting of Sierra MatchKing hollow-point boat-tail projectiles, Federal Cartridge Company match cartridge cases and Gold Medal match primers.
 Cartridge, caliber 7.62mm, NATO, ball, barrier, T762TNB1 MK319 MOD 0 (United States): 7.62×51mm NATO enhance behind barrier performance enhance function and casualty and muzzle flash requirements in short barrel carbines, .

Department of Defense Identification Codes (DODIC)

This four-character alphanumeric code is used by the US Armed Forces and NATO to identify the cartridge, the cartridge type, and the packing method (cartons, clips, link belt, or bulk) used.
 A111 (7.62mm blank M82 linked): 100-round M13 linked belt (M82 blank) packed in a cardboard box. There are two boxes per M19A1 ammo can (200 rounds) and four M19A1 ammo cans per wire-bound crate (800 rounds). Used in M60 and M240 general purpose machineguns for training purposes.
 A159 (7.62mm dummy M172 linked) 100-round M13 linked belt (M172 dummy) packed in a cardboard box. There are two boxes per M19A1 ammo can (200 rounds) and four M19A1 ammo cans per wire-bound crate (800 rounds). The munition is designed to simulate a linked belt of M80 ball ammunition. Used for weapon manufacturing testing to conduct belt-pull tests for automatic weapons and for environmental conditioning tests of weapons, mounts and ammunition. The M172 linked belt is also used for developing new and/or improved mount systems for the vehicles that contain the M240-series machine gun.
 A165 (7.62mm ball/tracer linked): 750-round M13 linked belt (4 × M80 ball : 1 M62 tracer). Used in 7.62 mm miniguns.
 AA11 (7.62mm match ball M118LR): 20-round carton (M118 long range ball). There are 20 boxes per M2A1 ammo can (400 rounds) and two ammo cans per wire-bound crate (800 rounds). Used in precision match, designated marksman, and sniper rifles.
 AB79 (7.62mm ball M80A1 linked): 100-round M13 linked belt (M80A1 enhanced ball) packed in a cardboard box in an M4 bandoleer. There are two bandoleers (100 rounds each) per M19A1 ammo can (200 rounds total) and four M19A1 boxes per wire-bound crate (800 rounds). Used in M240 general purpose machineguns.
 AB86 (7.62mm ball/tracer linked): 100-round M13 linked belt (7.62mm ball/tracer linked) (4 × M80A1 enhanced ball : 1 M62A1 enhanced tracer) packed in a cardboard box in an M4 bandoleer. There are two bandoleers (100 rounds each) per M19A1 ammo can (200 rounds total) and four M19A1 boxes per wire-bound crate (800 rounds). Used in M240 general purpose machineguns.

See also
 7.62×54mmR
 7 mm caliber
 7.62 mm caliber
 Caliber conversion sleeve
 STANAG (Standardization Agreements of NATO)
 List of 7.62×51mm NATO firearms
 List of rifle cartridges
 Table of handgun and rifle cartridges

References

External links

 Various photos of 7.62×51 NATO ammunition
 DIRECT FIRE AMMUNITION Handbook 2019, Project Manager Maneuver Ammunition Systems 
 Municion.org collecting database

 
Weapons and ammunition introduced in 1954
Pistol and rifle cartridges
Military cartridges
NATO cartridges